Since the break-up of The Smiths, Morrissey has worked with several musicians throughout his career as a solo artist. The following is a list of musicians and personnel for each of his solo albums.

Current members

Former members

Recording timeline

Timeline

 Note: Morrissey was inactive from 1998 until 2003.

Other musicians
From Viva Hate
Richard Koster, Fenella Barton — violins  
Rachel Maguire, Mark Davies, Robert Woolhard — cellos 
John Metcalf - viola
From Bona Drag 
Kristy Maccoll - backing vocals on "Interesting Drug"
Mary Margaret O'Hara - backing vocals on "November Spawned a Monster"
Stephen Hopkins - piano on "Ouija Board, Ouija Board"
From Kill Uncle
 Seamus Beaghen and Steven Heart – keyboards
 Nawazish Ali Khan – violin
From Ringleader of the Tormentors
Ennio Morricone - string arrangement on "Dear God Please Help Me"
Laura Adriani, Gaia e Andrea Baroni, Niccolo Centioni, Julia D'Andrea, Alice e Ester Diodovich, Marco Lorecchio, Charlotte Patrignani - Children's choir on "The Youngest Was the Most Loved", "The Father Who Must Be Killed" and "At Last I Am Born"
From Years of Refusal
 Roger Joseph Manning Jr. – keyboards
 Mark Isham – trumpet on "I'm Throwing My Arms Around Paris", "When Last I Spoke to Carol" and "One Day Goodbye Will Be Farewell"
 Jeff Beck – guitar on "Black Cloud" 
 Michael Farrell – keyboards, accordion, cowbell on "That's How People Grow Up" 
 Kristopher Pooley – backing vocals (tracks "Mama Lay Softly on the Riverbed", "When Last I Spoke to Carol", and "One Day Goodbye Will Be Farewell"  
 Kristeen Young – additional vocals on "That's How People Grow Up" 
 Chrissie Hynde – backing vocals on "Shame Is the Name"

Studio personnel
 Stephen Street, producer, 1988 (Viva Hate)
 Clive Langer, Alan Winstanley, producer, 1991 (Kill Uncle)
 Mick Ronson, producer, 1992 (Your Arsenal)
 Steve Lillywhite, producer, 1994-1997 (Vauxhall and I, Southpaw Grammar, and Maladjusted)
 Jerry Finn, producer, 2004, 2009 (You Are the Quarry, Years of Refusal)
 Tony Visconti, producer, 2006 (Ringleader of the Tormentors)
 Joe Chiccarelli, producer, 2013-2020 (World Peace Is None of Your Business, Low in High School, I Am Not a Dog on a Chain)

Solo Writing Credits

with Alain Whyte:-

 "Glamorous Glue", "We'll Let You Know", "The National Front Disco", "Certain People I Know", "We Hate It When Our Friends Become Successful", "You're the One for Me, Fatty", "Seasick, Yet Still Docked" and "Tomorrow" from Your Arsenal
 "Billy Budd", "Hold On to Your Friends", "Why Don't You Find Out for Yourself?", "I Am Hated for Loving", "Used to Be a Sweet Boy" and "The Lazy Sunbathers" from Vauxhall and I
 "The Boy Racer", "The Operation", "Dagenham Dave", "Do Your Best and Don't Worry", "Best Friend on the Payroll" and "Southpaw" from Southpaw Grammar – "Fantastic Bird" and  "Nobody Loves Us" (only on remastered version).
 "Alma Matters", "Ambitious Outsiders", "Trouble Loves Me", "Papa Jack", "Roy's Keen" and "He Cried" from Maladjusted - "Heir Apparent", "The Edges Are No Longer Parallel", "This Is Not Your Country"  and "Sorrow Will Come in the End" (only on 2009 re-release).
 "America Is Not the World", "Irish Blood, English Heart", "I Have Forgiven Jesus", "How Can Anybody Possibly Know How I Feel?", "First of the Gang to Die", "Let Me Kiss You", "All the Lazy Dykes" and "You Know I Couldn't Last" from You Are the Quarry
 "I Will See You in Far-Off Places", "Dear God Please Help Me", "The Father Who Must Be Killed", "Life Is a Pigsty", "I'll Never Be Anybody's Hero Now" and "To Me You Are a Work of Art" from Ringleader of the Tormentors
 "Something Is Squeezing My Skull", "Mama Lay Softly on the Riverbed", "When Last I Spoke to Carol", "It's Not Your Birthday Anymore" and "You Were Good in Your Time" from Years of Refusal
 "Good Looking Man About Town", "Don't Make Fun of Daddy's Voice", "Ganglord", "My Dearest Love", "The Never-Played Symphonies", "Shame Is the Name", "Munich Air Disaster 1958", "It's Hard to Walk Tall When You're Small", "Teenage Dad on His Estate", "Friday Mourning", "My Life Is a Succession of People Saying Goodbye" and "Because of My Poor Education" from Swords
 "Boulevard", "Notre-Dame", "Happy New Tears" and "The Monsters of Pig Alley" from Without Music the World Dies
 "Let the Right One Slip In", "There Speaks a True Friend", "Pashernate Love", "Black-Eyed Susan", "A Swallow on My Neck", "Whatever Happens, I Love You", "Have-a-Go Merchant, "You Must Please Remember" and "I Am Two People" are tracks that appeared on B-sides of Morrissey singles.
"Boxers" and "Sunny" are non-album singles.
 "Action Man", "Teresa, Teresa", "When I Was Young", "I Was Bully, Do Not Forget Me", "I'm Looking Forward to Going Back" and "Home Is a Question Mark" are unreleased tracks.

with Boz Boorer:-

"Now My Heart Is Full", "Spring-Heeled Jim", "The More You Ignore Me, the Closer I Get", "Lifeguard Sleeping, Girl Drowning" and "Speedway" from Vauxhall and I
"The Teachers Are Afraid of the Pupils" and "Reader Meet Author" from Southpaw Grammar – "Honey, You Know Where to Find Me" and "You Should Have Been Nice to Me" (only on remastered version).
"Maladjusted", "Ammunition" and "Satan Rejected My Soul" from Maladjusted - "I Can Have Both" (only on 2009 re-release).
"Come Back to Camden", "I'm Not Sorry", "The World Is Full of Crashing Bores" and "I Like You" from You Are the Quarry
"I'm Throwing My Arms Around Paris", "That's How People Grow Up", "Black Cloud" and "One Day Goodbye Will Be Farewell" from Years of Refusal
"Christian Dior" from Swords
"World Peace Is None of Your Business", "Istanbul", "Staircase at the University", "Mountjoy" and "Oboe Concerto" from World Peace Is None of Your Business – "Drag the River", "Scandinavia", "Julie in the Weeds" and "Art-Hounds" (only on deluxe version).
"I Wish You Lonely", "Jacky's Only Happy When She's Up on the Stage", "All the Young People Must Fall in Love" and "Who Will Protect Us from the Police?" from Low in High School – "Lover-To-Be" and "This Song Doesn't End When It's Over" (only on deluxe version).
"Rebels Without Applause" from Bonfire of Teenagers
"Jack the Ripper", "You've Had Her", "I'd Love To", "Mexico", "Noise Is the Best Revenge", "The Public Image", "The Slum Mums", "Action Is My Middle Name", "The Kid's a Looker" and "Brow of My Beloved" are tracks that appeared on B-sides of Morrissey singles.
"Kit", "I Know Who I Love", "I'm Playing Easy to Get", "Blue Dreamers Eyes", "Diana Dors" and "I Couldn't Understand Why People Laughed" are unreleased tracks.

with Jesse Tobias:-

"You Have Killed Me", "The Youngest Was the Most Loved", "In The Future When All's Well", "On the Streets I Ran" and "I Just Want to See the Boy Happy" from Ringleader of the Tormentors
"All You Need Is Me", "Sorry Doesn't Help" and "I'm OK by Myself" from Years of Refusal
"I Knew I Was Next", "If You Don't Like Me, Don't Look at Me" and "Children in Pieces" from Swords
"I'm Not a Man", "The Bullfighter Dies", "Kiss Me a Lot", "Smiler with Knife" and "Kick the Bride Down the Aisle" from World Peace Is None of Your Business – "Forgive Someone" (only on deluxe version).
"I Bury The Living" and "When You Open Your Legs" from Low in High School
"Jim Jim Falls", "I Am Not a Dog On a Chain", "What Kind of People Live in These Houses?", "Knockabout World", "Once I Saw the River Clean" and "My Hurling Days Are Done" from I Am Not a Dog on a Chain
"Kerouac's Crack", "I Live in Oblivion" and "I Ex-Love You" from Bonfire of Teenagers
"The Night Pop Dropped" and "Zoom Zoom The Little Boy" from Without Music the World Dies
"People Are the Same Everywhere" is a track that appeared on a B-side of a Morrissey single.
"Once Upon a Woman's Body" and "You Don't Need Their Approval" are unreleased tracks.

with Stephen Street:-

"Alsatian Cousin", "Little Man, What Now?", "Everyday Is Like Sunday", "Bengali In Platforms", "Angel, Angel Down We Go Together", "Late Night, Maudlin Street", "Suedehead", "Break Up The Family", "The Ordinary Boys", "I Don't Mind If You Forget Me", "Dial-a-Cliché" and "Margaret On The Guillotine" from Viva Hate – "Treat Me Like a Human Being" (only on remastered version).
"Interesting Drug", "Will Never Marry", "Such a Little Thing Makes Such a Big Difference", "The Last of the Famous International Playboys", "Ouija Board, Ouija Board", "Hairdresser on Fire", "Lucky Lisp" and "Disappointed" from Bona Drag – "Happy Lovers At Last United", "Lifeguard On Duty", "Please Help the Cause Against Loneliness" and "The Bed Took Fire" (only on 2010 re-release).
"I Know Very Well How I Got My Name", "Oh Well, I'll Never Learn", "Sister, I'm A Poet", "Michael's Bones", "Journalists Who Lie" and "Safe, Warm Lancashire Home" are tracks that appeared on B-sides of Morrissey singles.
"I Don't Want Us To Finish" is an unreleased track.

with Mark E. Nevin:-

"Our Frank", "Asian Rut", "Sing Your Life", "King Leer", "Driving Your Girlfriend Home", "The Harsh Truth of the Camera Eye", "(I'm) The End of the Family Line" and "There's a Place in Hell for Me and My Friends" from Kill Uncle
"You're Gonna Need Someone on Your Side" and "I Know It's Gonna Happen Someday" from Your Arsenal
"Tony The Pony", "The Loop" and "I've Changed My Plea To Guilty" are tracks that appeared on B-sides of Morrissey singles.
"Pregnant for the Last Time" and "My Love Life" are non-album singles.
"Kill Uncle" and "Born to Hang" are unreleased tracks.

with Gustavo Manzur:-

"Earth Is the Loneliest Planet" and "Neal Cassady Drops Dead" from World Peace Is None of Your Business – "One Of Our Own" (only on deluxe version).
"Spent the Day in Bed", "In Your Lap", "The Girl from Tel-Aviv Who Wouldn't Kneel" and "Israel" from Low in High School
"Love Is on Its Way Out", "Bobby, Don't You Think They Know?" and "The Truth About Ruth" from I Am Not a Dog on a Chain
"Sure Enough, the Telephone Rings" from Bonfire of Teenagers
"Headache", "Without Music the World Dies" and "Many Icebergs Ago" from Without Music the World Dies

with Mando Lopez:-

"My Love, I'd Do Anything for You" and "Home Is a Question Mark" from Low in High School – "Never Again Will I Be a Twin" (only on deluxe version).
"Darling, I Hug a Pillow" and "The Secret of Music" from I Am Not a Dog on a Chain
"Ha Ha Harlem" and "Bonfire of Teenagers" from Bonfire of Teenagers
"If Saturday Ever Comes" is an unreleased track.

with Gary Day:-

"You Know I Couldn't Last" from You Are the Quarry
"Pashernate Love", "Mexico", "Let the Right One Slip In", "The Slum Mums", and "Noise is the Best Revenge" are tracks that appeared on B-sides of Morrissey singles.

with Clive Langer:-

"November Spawned a Monster" from Bona Drag
"Mute Witness" and "Found, Found, Found" from Kill Uncle
"Striptease With A Difference" is an unreleased track.

with Spencer Cobrin:-

"Wide To Receive" from Maladjusted - "Lost" and "Now I Am A Was" (only on 2009 re-release).
"It's Hard to Walk Tall When You're Small" is an unreleased track.

with Andy Rourke:-

"Yes, I Am Blind" from Bona Drag
"Girl Least Likely To" and "Get Off The Stage" are tracks that appeared on B-sides of Morrissey singles.

with Kevin Armstrong:-

"Piccadilly Palare" and "He Knows I'd Love To See Him" from Bona Drag - "Oh Phoney" (only on 2010 re-release).

with Michael Farrell:-

"At Last I am Born" from Ringleader of the Tormentors
"Sweetie-Pie" from Swords

with unknown:-

"I Am Veronica", "My Funeral", "Diana Dors" and "Saint in a Stained Glass Window" from Bonfire of Teenagers
"By The Time I Get To Wherever I'm Going" is an unreleased track. 

not written by Morrissey (ie cover versions):-

"Redondo Beach" (live) and "Subway Train" (live) from Live at Earls Court
"Drive-In Saturday" (live) from Swords
"Morning Starship", "Don't Interrupt the Sorrow", "Only a Pawn in Their Game", "Suffer the Little Children", "Days of Decision", It's Over, "Wedding Bell Blues", "Loneliness Remembers What Happiness Forgets", "Lady Willpower", "When You Close Your Eyes", "Lenny's Tune" and "Some Say I Got Devil" from California Son
"Suspicious Minds" from Without Music the World Dies
"A Song from Under the Floorboards", "Are You Sure Hank Done It This Way?" (live), "East West", "Human Being", "I Didn't Know What To Do" (live), "It Happens Every Time", "Judy Is A Punk" (live), "Moon River", "No One Can Hold A Candle To You", "Rose Garden" (live), "Skin Storm", "To Give (The Reason I Live)" (live), "Trash" (live), "You Say You Don't Love Me" (live) and "You'll Be Gone" (live) are tracks that appeared on B-sides of Morrissey singles.
"Interlude" (with Siouxsie Sioux), "Satellite of Love" (live), "Back on the Chain Gang" and "Cosmic Dancer" (live with David Bowie) / "That's Entertainment" are non-album singles.
"Rainbow Valley", "Alone Again (Naturally)" (live), "El Cóndor Pasa" (live), "Moon Over Kentucky" (live), "My Insatiable One" (live), "Nothing Rhymed" (live), "Simon Smith And His Amazing Dancing Bear" (live) and "Street Life" (live) are unreleased tracks.

Morrissey
Personnel